The Truce of Zamość was signed on November 20, 1648 during the siege of Zamość between the King of Poland John II Casimir of Poland and the Hetman of Zaporizhian Host Bohdan Khmelnytsky.

Background

That truce ended the first raid of Bohdan Khmelnytsky army into the territory of modern Poland. During the siege of Zamość that started two weeks prior to the signing of the truce on November 6, 1648, Bohdan Khmelnytsky had established diplomatic relations with government circles of the Polish–Lithuanian Commonwealth. His aim was to use the elections of a new King of Poland for insurgents' purposes. For tactical reasons the Hetman supported the candidacy of John II Casimir of Poland, hoping that John Casimir would be more amenable to a peace favorable to Khmelnytsky, than others candidates to the Crown. The Hetman's hopes came true. After the election of King John II Casimir Vasa, a true was signed at Zamość (the siege of the city of Zamość was lifted on November 24, 1648).

Negotiations
In the negotiations with diplomatic mission from the Cossack's side there was the brother of Hetman Zakhary Khmelnytsky, while the Polish–Lithuanian Commonwealth was represented by a priest Andrzej Mokrski (former teacher of Bohdan Khmelnytsky), noblemen J. Smiarowski and S. Oldakowski.

Main points
 Amnesty to the insurgents
 Liquidation of the Union (Union of Brest)
 Reinstatement of previous rights and freedoms of cossacks
 Ban on quartering of the Crown troops in lands of the Cossack Hetmanate
 Subordination of Hetman directly to the King

In the future, it was planned to establish a lasting peace, for which to the residence of Hetman in the beginning of 1649 had come a "committee" of the Commonwealth headed by Adam Kisiel.

Results
The truce was a compromise. It had supporters and opponents on both the Ukrainian as well as the Polish side. Having concluded an armistice, Khmelnytskyi avoided the need to continue the campaign in late autumn during an epidemic that erupted in the Cossack army, which could have resulted in dire consequences for the insurgents. However, by signing the truce, the Hetman was forced to withdraw Cossack troops from most of the western-Ukrainian cities and partially from Podillia (Podolia). The truce of  Zamość was short-lived, the Commonwealth first grossly violated it (the punitive offensive forces of the Grand Duchy of Lithuania into the Southern Belarus in January–February 1649). Another truce was signed later in Pereiaslav).

Further reading
 Holubytsky, V. Diplomatic history of the Ukrainian National Liberation War, 1648-1654. Kiev 1961.
 Smoliy, V., Stepankov, V. Bohdan Khmelnytsky. Kiev 1993.
 Hrushevsky, M. History of Ukraine-Rus. Vol.8. Kiev 1995.

See also
List of treaties

References

External links
 Mytsyk, Yu. Truce of Zamosc 1648. Encyclopedia of History of Ukraine. "Naukova dumka". Kiev 2005.

1648 in the Polish–Lithuanian Commonwealth
1648 treaties
Zamosc
Poland–Ukraine military relations
Treaties of the Cossack Hetmanate
History of Zamość
17th century in the Zaporozhian Host